This is a list of most populous municipalities in Belgium. Out of the 581 Belgian municipalities (as of 1 January 2019) the list contains all those with a population over 30,000.

A Belgian municipality may or may not have an additional, Royally-decreed city status in Belgium. Brussels, for example, is a singular urban unit consisting of 19 municipalities, only one of which is the city of Brussels.

List

See also

 City status in Belgium
 Metropolitan areas in Belgium
 Municipalities of Belgium
 List of cities in Flanders
 List of cities in Wallonia
 List of cities in Europe
 Lists of cities

References

 Population Statistics (French)
 Population Statistics (Dutch)

External links
 Population data on Belgium
 Tourist guide to major cities in Belgium

Populous, most